Mary Mambwe (born 27 October 2002) is a Zambian footballer who plays as a midfielder. She has been a member of the Zambia women's national team.

Club career
Mambwe has played for Nkwazi FC.

International career
Mambwe represented Zambia at the 2019 COSAFA U-20 Women's tournament. At senior level, she played the 2018 Africa Women Cup of Nations qualification (first round).

References

2002 births
Living people
Women's association football midfielders
Zambian women's footballers
Zambia women's international footballers